NA-43 South Waziristan Upper-cum-South Waziristan Lower is a constituency for the National Assembly of Pakistan covers whole Upper South Waziristan District and Lower South Waziristan District.

Members of Parliament

2002–2018: NA-41 Tribal Area-VI

2018-2022: NA-50 Tribal Area-XI

Election 2002 

General elections were held on 10 Oct 2002. Abdul Malik an Independent candidate won by 8,005 votes.

Election 2008 

General election 2008 were held on 18 Feb, 2008. Maulana Abdul Malik Wazir an Independent candidatewon by 7,957 votes.

Election 2013 

General elections were held on 11 May 2013. Ghalib Khan of PML-N won  by 8,022 votes and became the  member of National Assembly.

Election 2018

General elections were held on 25 July 2018.

See also
NA-42 Tank
NA-44 Dera Ismail Khan-I

References

External links 
 Election result's official website

50
50